Xerotricha bierzona is a species of air-breathing land snail, terrestrial pulmonate gastropod mollusks in the family Geomitridae, the hairy snails and their allies.

Distribution

This species is endemic to Spain.

References

 Gittenberger, E. & Manga, M. Y. (1977). Some new species of the genus Helicella (Pulmonata, Helicidae) from the province León, Spain. Zoologische Mededelingen. 51 (11): 177-189, pl. 1-2. Leiden
 Bank, R. A.; Neubert, E. (2017). Checklist of the land and freshwater Gastropoda of Europe. Last update: July 16th, 2017

Fauna of Spain
Geomitridae
Endemic fauna of Spain
Gastropods described in 1977
Taxonomy articles created by Polbot